"I Got a Feelin' in My Body" is a song by Elvis Presley from his 1974 album Good Times.

In 1979, it was released posthumously on the reverse side of the single "There's a Honky Tonk Angel (Who Will Take Me Back In)". The single reached number 6 in the Billboard Country Singles Chart.

Writing and recording 
The song was written by Dennis Linde.

Presley recorded it on December 10 during the December 10–16, 1973 studio sessions for RCA at the Stax Studios in Memphis, Tennessee.

Its first release on record was on the album ''Good Times in 1974.

Track listing 
7" single
 "I Got a Feelin' in My Body" (3:33)
 "There's a Honky Tonk Angel (Who Will Take Me Back In)" (3:02)

Charts

References

External links 
 Elvis Presley - I Got A Feelin' In My Body / There's A Honky Tonk Angel (Who Will Take Me Back In) at Discogs
 Elvis Presley - I Got A Feelin' In My Body на сайте Ultratop.be

1974 songs
1979 singles
Elvis Presley songs
Songs written by Dennis Linde